The 1969–70 season was the 90th season of competitive football by Rangers.

Overview
Rangers played a total of 47 competitive matches during the 1969–70 season.

Results
All results are written with Rangers' score first.

Scottish First Division

European Cup-Winners Cup

Scottish Cup

League Cup

Appearances

See also
 1969–70 in Scottish football
 1969–70 Scottish Cup
 1969–70 Scottish League Cup
 1969–70 European Cup Winners' Cup

References 

Rangers F.C. seasons
Rangers